Lagrange Creek is a  long 3rd order tributary to the Rappahannock River in Middlesex County, Virginia.

Variant names
According to the Geographic Names Information System, it has also been known historically as:  
La Grange Creek
In colonial times it was known as

 Burnham's Creek
 Sunderland Creek

Course
Lagrange Creek rises on the Briery Swamp and Wyatt Swamp divide about 2 miles southeast of Jamaica, Virginia.  Lagrange Creek then flows southeast to meet the Rappahannock River at Long Point, Virginia.

Watershed
Lagrange Creek drains  of area, receives about 45.7 in/year of precipitation, has a topographic wetness index of 512.02 and is about 40.9% forested.

Maps

See also
List of rivers of Virginia

References

Bodies of water of Middlesex County, Virginia
Rivers of Virginia
Tributaries of the Chesapeake Bay